Jeffrey Leib Nettler Zimbalist (born 1978) is an American filmmaker. He has been Academy Award shortlisted, has won a Peabody, a DuPont, and 3 Emmy Awards, with 13 Emmy nominations. He is the owner of film and television production company All Rise Films.

Early life
Jeffrey Leib Nettler Zimbalist was born in Northampton, Massachusetts, attending Northampton High School. He played baseball, football, and competitively skied. He received his bachelor's degree from Brown University in Providence, Rhode Island in 2000.

Career
Zimbalist's films have been shown on Netflix, HBO, Apple, ESPN, Fox, Showtime, CBS, Paramount+ and theatrically exhibited. He has done commercial work for Gatorade, Pepsi, DirecTV, Red Bull, Verizon, and the NFL.

Zimbalist's work has also been featured in a retrospective at the Big Sky Film Festival, at the Museum of the Moving Image in New York, the Museum of Contemporary Art, Chicago, the High Museum of Art in Atlanta, the Brooklyn Museum of Art, the Massachusetts Museum of Contemporary Art, the Museum of Fine Arts, Boston and the Institute of Contemporary Arts in London.

Favela Rising - 2005 
Together with Matt Mochary, Zimbalist won the Best Emerging Filmmaker Award at the 2005 TriBeCa Film Festival for his film Favela Rising. Favela Rising also garnered a 2006 Emmy Nomination for Zimbalist, was named as the 2005 International Documentary Association's Film of the Year, was shortlisted for the Academy Award for Best Documentary Feature in 2005, and won 36 International Film Festival Awards. The film follows the life of Anderson Sa through the favelas of Rio de Janeiro in his attempt to use Afro-Reggae music to provide a positive outlet for the residents of a dangerous environment. The film was distributed by Thinkfilm and HBO Documentary Films in North America and was theatrically released in 16 countries.

The Two Escobars - 2010 
In 2010, Disney / ESPN Films released The Two Escobars which Zimbalist directed and produced with his brother Michael. Zimbalist also was credited as the director of photography and editor. The film was nominated for another Emmy and was an official selection at the Cannes Film Festival, the Tribeca Film Festival, the Los Angeles Film Festival, and the IDFA International Film Festival. In 2011, Jeff and Michael Zimbalist's script for The Two Escobars was nominated for a best nonfiction script by the Writers Guild of America and was named 2010 Documentary of the Year alongside The Tillman Story by Sports Illustrated. Of the over 150 films in the Academy Award-winning and Emmy Award-winning 30 for 30 series, the New York Post and Vulture ranked The Two Escobars as the best one. In 2019, The Hollywood Reporter ranked the show the 5th best TV series of the decade behind Breaking Bad, Mad Men, Rectify, and Parks and Recreation. The Zimbalists shared the 2011 Peabody Award with this first season of ESPN Films 30 for 30 filmmakers.

Since, the Zimbalist brothers also directed two other entries into the 30for30 series, including Arnold's Blueprint with Arnold Schwarzenegger and Youngstown Boys, featuring hall-of-famer Jim Brown, which won an Emmy in 2014.

Pelé / Loving Pablo - 2011 to 2017 
Zimbalist directed The Greatest Love Story Ever Told about the Bollywood film industry in India, produced by Academy Award winner Shekhar Kapur, which premiered at the Cannes Film Festival in 2011 and was theatrically distributed internationally by Wild Bunch. In 2014, the Zimbalist brothers wrote and directed a scripted feature film on the early life of soccer legend Pelé for Imagine Entertainment with Academy Award winner Brian Grazer producing and an original score from Academy Award winner AR Rahman. Pelé: Birth of a Legend was distributed theatrically worldwide. Pelé attended the premieres in-person at the Cannes Film Festival and Tribeca Film Festival. Zimbalist also wrote and produced Loving Pablo starring Javier Bardem and Penelope Cruz, which premiered at the Venice International Film Festival and the Toronto International Film Festival and was released by Universal Studios.

Momentum Generation / Nossa Chape / Give Us This Day - 2018 
In 2018, Zimbalist won an Emmy and an Audience Award at the Tribeca Film Festival alongside 25 other international film festival awards, 5 New York Film & TV Gold Awards and the Grand Prize, and two Emmy nominations for his documentary Momentum Generation, starring Kelly Slater and Rob Machado and executive produced by Robert Redford. The same year, Zimbalist premiered Nossa Chape at the SxSw Film Festival. Nossa Chape was released theatrically in the US on June 1, 2018 by Fox with an introduction by Dwayne "The Rock" Johnson and broadcast premiered during the World Cup on Fox June 23, 2018. Nossa Chape won Best Picture at the 2018 Los Angeles Film Awards, where Momentum Generation won Best Inspirational Film, and the Zimbalist Brother's feature documentary Give Us This Day, produced by Vince Vaughn, tracking 3 police officers and 3 residents in the highest homicide rate city in the U.S., won the Best Director honor. Give Us This Day also won 4 Medals at the New York Film & TV Awards. Also in 2018, Zimbalist released the 20-episode Phenoms series on Fox Sports about rising global soccer stars.

ReMastered / Heist / The Line Series - 2019 to 2021 
In 2019, Zimbalist created and was showrunner on the Emmy-winning Netflix investigative music documentary series ReMastered, executive produced by Irving Azoff. The series featured episodes on Bob Marley, Johnny Cash, Robert Johnson, Run DMC, and others, with appearances by Quincy Jones and Russell Simmons, and an episode directed by Academy Award winner Barbara Kopple. ReMastered was nominated for 6 Emmys, won an Emmy for Best Arts and Culture Documentary for The Lion's Share, was nominated for an NAACP award for The Two Killings of Sam Cooke, and topped Netflix highest rated documentaries of 2019 with the episode Who Shot The Sheriff. David Browne wrote in Rolling Stone, "Eye opening, all-in reporting brings fresh insight to tales and myths we thought we knew.". The episode Who Killed Jam Master Jay? pointed to two suspects as the likely culprits of the rapper's unsolved murder from 15 years earlier. A year after ReMastered's release, the NYPD arrested the same two men indicated in the episode.

In 2021, Zimbalist was co-executive producer on Dirty Robber's Heist series, which was released on Netflix and ranked in Netflix top 5 worldwide and top 10 in the United States in July, 2021. Zimbalist also directed and executive produced Jigsaw's The Line (TV series)|The Line series for Apple TV+ with Executive Producer Alex Gibney, which won a Columbia DuPont Journalism Award in 2021 and was nominated for two Emmy Awards in the Best Documentary and Outstanding Investigative Documentary categories.

11 Minutes / With This Breath I Fly / Invisible Beauty / The War For Football - 2022 to 2023 
In 2022, Zimbalist executive produced and directed the series 11 Minutes, which became the highest rated documentary or documentary series on Paramount+ since the streamer launched. He also executive produced With This Breath I Fly about two women incarcerated in Afghanistan for so-called "moral crimes." With This Breath I Fly won 10 film festival awards. 

In 2023, Zimbalist executive produced Invisible Beauty about black fashion pioneer Bethann Hardison, which premiered at the Sundance Film Festival. Zimbalist also executive produced and directed the Apple+ series Super League: The War for Football.

Charitable Work
Zimbalist has produced development documentaries and consulted for clients in the United States, South Asia, Africa, and Latin America, including the Ford Foundation, the World Bank, the Templeton Foundation, the Inter-American Development Bank, the UNDP, and various international nonprofit service organizations. He is a Massachusetts State Cultural Council Fellow, a Cinereach grantee, a San Francisco Film Society Rainin Grant recipient, LEF grant recipient, and a Ford Foundation Grantee.

Zimbalist teaches at the New York Film Academy and the Maine Photographic Workshops.

Zimbalist's done philanthropy work for Amigos de las Américas, an organization that he volunteered with as a teenager.

References

External links

Interviews 
 Cinematical
 NEFilm
 Brown Alumni Magazine

1978 births
Living people
Brown University alumni
People from Northampton, Massachusetts
New York Film Academy